James Albert Groves (July 1883 – 1939) was an English footballer who played in the Football League for Lincoln City, Middlesbrough and Sheffield United.

References

1883 births
1939 deaths
English footballers
Lincoln City F.C. players
Middlesbrough F.C. players
Sheffield United F.C. players
English Football League players
People from South Bank, Redcar and Cleveland
Sportspeople from Yorkshire
Association football fullbacks